Salvia transsylvanica is a herbaceous perennial native to a wide area from north and central Russia to Romania. It was described and named in 1853 by botanist Philipp Johann Ferdinand Schur, with the specific epithet referring to the Transylvanian Alps located in central Romania. It was introduced into horticulture in the 1980s.

Salvia transsylvanica puts out several lax  stems from a basal clump of leaves. The leaves that grow on the stem vary in size—being larger at the bottom—with the upper side being dark yellow-green and the underside pale with yellow veins. The leaves are very scalloped around the edges. Many flowers bloom at once, giving the plant a very colorful and striking appearance.

Notes

transsylvanica
Flora of Romania
Flora of Russia
Plants described in 1853